Trailer Park Boys is a Canadian mockumentary television series created and directed by Mike Clattenburg and a continuation of Clattenburg's 1999 film of the same name. The series focuses on the misadventures of a group of trailer park residents, some of whom are ex-convicts, living in the fictional Sunnyvale Trailer Park in Dartmouth, Nova Scotia.

Main series overview

Episodes

Original series 
All episodes from seasons 1 to 7 are directed by series creator Mike Clattenburg  who also co-wrote every episode. John Paul Tremblay who plays Julian and Robb Wells who plays Ricky also co-wrote all episodes. Producer Barrie Dunn who also plays Ray, co-wrote all episodes during the first two seasons, as well as co-writing one season three episode. Season 6 was the last season featuring Trevor (Michael Jackson) after which, he left the show. Corey Bowles, who plays Corey, also left the show after Season 6, but returned in Season 8. Jackie Torrens, sister of cast member Jonathan Torrens, co-wrote the third-season episodes, and Michael Volpe who serves as a producer, co-wrote an episode. Mike Smith who plays Bubbles, began co-writing episodes from season four to six. Iain MacLeod, who is also a story editor, began co-writing various episodes beginning with season four, and co-wrote all season six and seven episodes. Jonathan Torrens who plays J-Roc began co-writing episodes in season five and six. Timm Hannebohm joined the writing staff in season seven, and co-wrote all episodes.

Season 1 (2001)

Season 2 (2002)

Season 3 (2003)

Season 4 (2004)

Season 5 (2005)

Season 6 (2006)

Season 7 (2007)

Revival 
Starting with season 8, Mike Clattenburg no longer directs or writes any episodes and has no formal involvement in the show after selling the rights to the trio. He is credited at the end of every episode of the revived series as "Based on the original Trailer Park Boys series produced by Mike Clattenburg, Barrie Dunn and Mike Volpe." Each episode is written by the series stars John Paul Tremblay (as JP Tremblay), Robb Wells and Mike Smith and is directed by various directors.

Season 8 (2014) 
On July 4, 2013, it was announced that John Paul Tremblay, Robb Wells and Mike Smith acquired the rights to Trailer Park Boys and confirmed it would return with an eighth season, that would be broadcast on their Internet channel, SwearNet.com. However, on March 5, 2014, it was announced season 8 would premiere exclusively on Netflix, and the streaming service would also make a ninth season.

Season 9 (2015) 
On March 5, 2014, it was confirmed that Netflix would air seasons 8 and 9. All episodes of season 9 were released on Netflix on March 27, 2015.

Season 10 (2016)

Season 11 (2017)

Season 12 (2018)

Specials & Webisodes

Specials

Webisodes

Season 7.5 (2014)

Leading up to the premiere of season 8, six short web clip episodes were made available for their website, called Season 7.5.

Season 8.5 (2014–15)

Spin-offs

Trailer Park Boys: Out of the Park: Europe (2016)

Set the Between the Events of Seasons 10 and 11, this mini-series was released on Netflix. Official description: "The Trailer Park Boys are thrilled to get a free trip to Europe, until they arrive and learn about their corporate sponsor's unusual requirements."

Trailer Park Boys: Out of the Park: USA (2017)

This mini-series was released on Netflix between Seasons 11 and 12. Official description: "The boys are back on the loose as Bubbles, Julian and Ricky head south of the Canadian border for some outrageous American adventures."

Trailer Park Boys: The Animated Series (2019–2020)

Season 1 (2019)

Season 2 (2020)

Trailer Park Boys: Jail (2021)

Trailer Park Boys: Jail Shorts (2021)

Films

Trailer Park Boys (1999)

The Movie (2006)

Countdown to Liquor Day (2009)

Don't Legalize It (2014)

References

External links
 

Trailer Park Boys
Lists of Canadian television series episodes
Lists of comedy television series episodes